Harry Rust Virgin (August 25, 1854 – April 11, 1932) was an American politician from Maine. Virgin, a Republican, served three terms in the Maine Legislature, including a term as the Maine Senate President. He was the son of Colonel William Wirt Virgin of Rumford and Sarah Hall Cole from Norway, Maine. He lived in Portland, Maine, while in the legislature.

Virgin was first elected to Portland City Council. In 1898, he was elected to the Maine House of Representatives. Two years later, he was elected to the Maine Senate. Following re-election to that body in 1902, he was chosen Senate President for his third and final term. His father also had served as Senate President. William and Henry Virgin are the only father-son duo to both hold that position in Maine history.

References

1854 births
1932 deaths
People from Rumford, Maine
Portland, Maine City Council members
Republican Party members of the Maine House of Representatives
Presidents of the Maine Senate
Republican Party Maine state senators